Jaouen Hadjam (born 26 March 2003) is an Algerian professional footballer who plays as a left-back for Ligue 1 club FC Nantes.

Club career
On 18 January 2019, Hadjam signed his first professional contract with Paris FC. Hadjam made his professional debut with Paris FC in a 3–0 Ligue 2 win over FC Chambly on 22 August 2020.

Although approached for some time to the Italian club of Salernitana, on 17 January 2023 Hadjam joined Ligue 1 side FC Nantes for an undisclosed fee, signing a contract until June 2027 with the club. On 22 January 2023 he made his debut with canaries in a penalties away win against ES Thaon in Coupe de France. Seven days later, Hadjam made his debut in Ligue 1 from the first minute against Clermont Foot.

International career
Hadjam was born in France and is of Algerian descent. He is a youth international for France, having played up to the France U19s.

Career statistics

References

External links
 
 
 Paris FC Profile

2003 births
Living people
French sportspeople of Algerian descent
French footballers
Footballers from Paris
Association football fullbacks
France youth international footballers
Ligue 2 players
Ligue 1 players
Paris FC players
FC Nantes players